The 1924 Tour of the Basque Country was the inaugural edition of the Tour of the Basque Country cycle race and was held from 7 August to 10 August 1924. The race started and finished in Bilbao. The race was won by Francis Pélissier.

General classification

References

1924
Bas